Woman with Bicycle is a six-story wall painting created by the American painter, sculptor and muralist Knox Martin in 1979 under the sponsorship of the Public Art Fund.

Former Landmark
A well-known New York City art landmark, Woman with Bicycle was located at Houston and MacDougal Streets in Manhattan. Vivian Raynor of The New York Times wrote in 1981 of Knox Martin and Woman with Bicycle:

In 2002, Woman with Bicycle was covered over with an underwear ad.

See also
 Venus (mural)

References

Further reading
Randy Fordyce, Knox Martin in the Spotlight, Not Just Jazz: The Uncommon Denominator 1:3 (1980)
Alister Ramirez, La Visión Alfa de Knox Martin, El Tiempo (January 30, 1994).
Mark Golden, Knox Martin at the Sam & Adele Golden Gallery, Just Paint, Issue 27 (September 2012). 

Bicycles in art
Cultural history of New York City
Murals in New York City
Women in art